Eldorado is a British horror-comedy film written and directed by Richard Driscoll and stars Daryl Hannah, David Carradine, and Michael Madsen. It also stars Brigitte Nielsen, Kerry Washington, Jeff Fahey, Steve Guttenberg, Bill Moseley, Sylvester McCoy, Tyrese Gibson, and Peter O'Toole. The film has been described as a horror/comedy/musical road movie. The film was also released under the title Highway to Hell.

Cast 
 Daryl Hannah as The Stranger
 David Carradine as The Spirit Guide
 Darren Morgan as Stan Rosenblum
 Richard Driscoll as Ollie Rosenblum
 Peter O'Toole as The Narrator
 Jeff Fahey as "Doc" Martin
 Michael Madsen as Ted
 Patrick Bergin as Roy
 Brigitte Nielsen as Angel
 Steve Guttenberg as J.J.
 Kerry Washington as Tamara
 Rik Mayall as Chef Mario
 Sylvester McCoy as General Zwick
 Caroline Munro as Lilly
 Robin Askwith as Mick
 Tyrese Gibson as David
 Bill Moseley as Lemma
 Robert Llewellyn as "Meat"
 Buster Bloodvessel as Sheriff

Parodies 
The film parodies many other films specifically of the horror musical genre including Sweeney Todd, The Blues Brothers and Little Shop of Horrors.

Release 
The film was to receive a wide release in both the UK and in the USA in November 2010, however, though production was complete, it was not released.

On 5 June 2013 it was reported in the British media that the director had funded the film by filing false VAT tax returns to the British government. Driscoll was alleged to have falsely claimed the movie's budget to be $15 million, the figure was actually only $1.5 million, boosted by a further $2.35 million defrauded from HMRC.  He was convicted at Southwark Crown Court, and sentenced to three years imprisonment.

The film never received a theatrical release, and was published direct-to-video in the United Kingdom.

References

External links 
 

2012 films
British comedy horror films
2012 3D films
2010s road movies
British road movies
British musical films
2010s musical films
2012 comedy horror films
Jukebox musical films
2010s English-language films
2010s British films